William Fleming (born 30 April 1901) was a Scottish footballer who played for Vale of Leven, Celtic, Ayr United and Dundee United.

Born in Alexandria, his career path was unconventional in that he began his Scottish Football League career at local club Vale of Leven as a centre half, was converted to a centre forward role in his one season at Celtic (where he scored four goals in his debut but deputised for Jimmy McGrory and Patsy Gallacher and was not involved in their 1925 Scottish Cup Final victory), continued up front in his first season at second-tier Ayr United where his goal return was a respectable 20 in 30 appearances, but then switched back to a defensive role, where he stayed for eight more years at Ayr – which featured a promotion to the top tier as winners of 1927–28 Scottish Division Two followed by a sustained spell in the highest division – and in his final season with Dundee United back in the lower tier.

References

1901 births
20th-century deaths
Year of death unknown
Place of death missing
Scottish footballers
Vale of Leven F.C. players
Ayr United F.C. players
Celtic F.C. players
Dundee United F.C. players
Duntocher Hibernian F.C. players
Scottish Football League players
Scottish Junior Football Association players
People from Alexandria, West Dunbartonshire
Footballers from West Dunbartonshire
Association football defenders
Association football forwards